Hamburg-Harburg or Harburg is one of four operational main-line railway stations (Fernbahnhöfe) in the city of Hamburg, Germany. Opened on 1 May 1897, it is situated on the Hannover-Hamburg, Wanne-Eickel-Hamburg and Lower Elbe lines as well as the Harburg S-Bahn line. Train services are operated by Deutsche Bahn and Metronom with the rapid transit station (named just Harburg) being served by the Hamburg S-Bahn. The station is managed by DB Station&Service.

History
The underground S-Bahn station was opened in 1983.

Layout

The railway tracks and platforms for the main station are at-grade; the S-Bahn tracks from Hamburg Hauptbahnhof (lines S3 and S31) converge at the underground station.

Train services
The following services call at the station:

Long distance service

Regional trains

Rapid transit 

Lines S3 and S31, coming from the southwest of the city and Stade, continue via the Hauptbahnhof toward Pinneberg or Altona in the northwest.

Buses
A bus station served by several bus lines offering connections to places both inside and outside city boundaries is located in front of the railway station.

Facilities
Parking spaces for both cars and bikes are available. Several shops are located in the station building. There are personnel at the station for ticket sales, information and also assistance for handicapped persons. Lockers and safes, toilets, and SOS and information telephones are also provided.

See also 
 Hamburger Verkehrsverbund
 Harburg, Hamburg

References

External links 
 Picture of the Hamburg-Harburg station (in German)

Hamburg S-Bahn stations in Hamburg
Railway stations located underground in Hamburg
Buildings and structures in Harburg, Hamburg
Railway stations in Germany opened in 1897